Poverty in Switzerland refers to people who are living in relative poverty in Switzerland. In 2018, 7.9% of the population or some 660,000 people in Switzerland were affected by income poverty. Switzerland has also a significant number of working poor, estimated at 145,000 in 2015.

Historically, Switzerland has been a poor country, especially the Alpine regions. From the 17th century, incipient industrialisation brought wealth to the cities, particularly to Zürich, but rural areas remained destitute well into the 19th century, causing the peasant war in 1653, and later forcing families to emigrate both to Russia and the Americas (including to Argentina, Brazil, Canada, Chile, Guatemala, the United States, Uruguay, and Venezuela).

In the 20th century, the economy of modern Switzerland came to establish itself among the world's most prosperous and stable, and in terms of human development index (at 0.946) Switzerland ranks second worldwide only behind Norway. As of 2019, Switzerland had the highest average wealth per adult, at $564,653.

General statistics on income and wealth
In 2013 the mean  household income in Switzerland was CHF 120,624 (c. USD 134,000 nominal, US$101,000 PPP), the mean household income after social security, taxes and mandatory health insurance was CHF 85,560 (c. USD 95,000 nominal, US$72,000 PPP). The OECD lists Swiss household gross adjusted disposable income per capita US$32,594 PPP for 2011.

As of 2016, Switzerland had the highest average wealth per adult, at $561,900. The top 1% richest persons own 35% of all the wealth in Switzerland, and this disparity has been increasing in recent years according to official statistics. 

This development was tied to the exchange rate between the US Dollar and the Swiss franc, which caused capital in Swiss francs to more than double its value in dollar terms during the 2000s and especially in the wake of the financial crisis of 2007–2008, without any direct increase in value in terms of domestic purchasing power.

Switzerland has the comparatively high Gini coefficient of 0.8, similar to the US and Denmark, indicating unequal distribution. The high average wealth is explained by a comparatively high number of individuals who are extremely wealthy; the median (50th percentile) wealth of a Swiss adult is five times lower than the average, at US$100,900 (US$70,000 PPP as of 2011).

Poverty

Nevertheless, Switzerland has a significant number of working poor, estimated at 145,000 in 2015. This number is out of a total of approximately 570,000 people (or about 7% of the total population) living in poverty. This number shows a slight increase from 2014 when it was 6.6%. In the same year, 8.9% of the population was making less than 50% of the median equalised income (about), with 4.5% making less than 40%. The median equivalised income is a number which half of the population makes more than, while half makes less. Because it uses the median it is less affected by the extremely rich.

Several groups continued to have the highest risk of poverty. They included those in a household where no one was gainfully employed (18.2% at risk of poverty), single adults living alone (12.5%), single parent households with children (12.5%) and those without any optional schooling (10.9%). Resident foreigners had a higher rate than Swiss citizens, with those from outside Europe having a poverty risk nearly twice that of citizens.

Compared to neighboring countries
As of 2016, Switzerland has a lower rate of people making 50% of the median equalised income (8.9%) than the European Union (10.9%), United Kingdom (9.9%) and Germany (9.7%), but a higher rate than countries such as Finland (4.9%), France (6.8%) and Austria (8.1%). The following chart provides information on the percentage and total numbers of the total population at risk for poverty (making less than 50% of the median equivalised income), the employed who are at risk for poverty and the 50% level for each country in equivalent purchasing power.

By age
Those of retirement age (older than 65) had an above average poverty level (13.9%), especially if they lived alone (22.8%, see chart below). However, these high numbers are somewhat misleading because the poverty numbers don't include assets which they saved or purchased while working. Because those over 65 often have reserves, very few responded to the survey that they were going into debt or had a hard time making ends meet. The number of retirement age people who could afford an unexpected expense was almost half of the national average. In fact, only 1.9% of retirees were not able to pay their bills on time, compared to 9.3% of 18 to 64 year olds.

By sex, language and national origin

By education level

By family type

Regional statistics

1.Percent of those 25 and older who have completed the listed education.
2.An index (50 is the national average) that attempts to quantifies status. Formula is (2.5 × % Tertiary education completed)−(2.0 × % Mandatory education only)+(% Management and skilled workers) − (% Unskilled workers) + (4 × % High income) − (2 × % Low income)
3.Ratio of workers in industries classed as High Tech or Knowledge-Intensive compared to national average (set to 1.0).

History

COVID-19 pandemic 
In 2020, the COVID-19 pandemic in Switzerland and the measures taken in response to it led to a recession, with many residents losing employment, income and wealth. In Geneva, a large-scale weekly distribution of food was organised, leading to thousands of people queuing for hours to receive a bag of basic staples. The scene attracted a lot of media attention in Geneva, throughout Switzerland and across the world, with journalists seizing on the scene as significant event given Geneva's status as one of the richest cities in the world. The recurring event led to a lot of comments by various politicians, experts and public figures, as well as on social media. Some commentators argued that this poverty was not a new phenomenon, was not exclusive to Geneva and was simply made more visible by the crisis. In other cities too, people queued for food, the absence of queues as large as those in Geneva being arguably due to differences in organisation of food distribution rather than needs, as well as lesser fear of arrest for undocumented people, although Geneva was probably the canton hardest hit by precarity before the coronavirus crisis. A survey conducted by Doctors without Borders and Geneva University Hospitals in which close to a third of the food parcel beneficiaries participated estimated that 60% of them lacked health insurance, with a diversity of socioeconomic profiles, including employed and unemployed people, as well as short time workers. Three quarters of people who queued were women, and around half were undocumented, a quarter were foreigners with residency permits, 5% were asylum seekers and 4% were Swiss citizens. The survey also found that members of the disadvantaged group were almost five times more exposed to the effects of COVID-19 due to problems such as cramped living conditions and reduced possibilities of getting treatment or a test.

See also
Poverty by country

Literature
Christin Kehrli, Carlo Knöpfel, Handbuch Armut in der Schweiz
Armut in der Schweiz, Evangelical People's Party (EVP) of the canton of Zürich (1999)

References

External links
raonline.ch